Repellent-1 is a Russian electronic warfare system designed to suppress the operation of unmanned aerial vehicles at a distance of up to . It weighs more than 20 tons.

History
"Repellent" was developed by the Russian Scientific and Technical Center for Electronic Combat (Russian: Научно-техническом центре радиоэлектронной борьбы). It is installed on the chassis of MAZ or KAMAZ depending on the wishes of the customer.

The development of "Repellent-1" was completed in 2016 and the system shown at an exhibition.

Operators
 Russia
 Armenia
 Kazakhstan - a supply contract was signed in 2016.

Application

Russian-Ukrainian war

On August 11, 2018, the OSCE SMM noted in a report that on July 28, near the village of Chornukhyne, the UAV mission recorded four EW systems at once, including Repellent-1.

Armenian-Azerbaijani border conflict

Armenia has lost two operating stations of the Repellent-1 complex.

Russian invasion of Ukraine (2022)

On May 1, 2022, it was reported that a Russian "Repellent-1" had been destroyed.

See also

Krasukha (electronic warfare system)
Divnomorya (electronic warfare system)
Shypshyna-AERO

References

Weapons of Russia
Electronic warfare equipment
Military electronics of Russia
War in Donbas